Dub Inc (previously known as Dub Incorporation) is a French reggae band from Saint-Étienne, active since 1997. They combine a range of styles, including dancehall, dub, ska and rap. Their music is also influenced by African music with their songs being sung in a mixture of French, English and Kabyle.

The band has released seven studio albums. The first three, Diversité (2003), Dans le décor (2005) and Afrikya (2008) to Dub Incorporation. However, starting with Hors Contrôle (2010), Paradise (2013), So What (2016), and Millions (2019), they shortened their name and credited the albums to Dub Inc.

Rude Boy Story is the first documentary film released about the band.

Members
Lead vocals
Hakim "Bouchkour" Meridja
Aurélien "Komlan" Zohou
Lead guitar
Jérémie Grégeois
Bass
Moritz Von Korff
Keyboards
Frédéric Peyron
Idir Derdiche
Drums & Percussions
Grégory "Zigo" Mavridorakis
Management
Mathieu

Discography

Albums 

Live albums

Singles

References

External links 

http://www.dub-inc.com
http://www.rudeboystory.com

French reggae musical groups
Organizations based in Saint-Étienne
Dancehall groups
French dub musical groups
Musical groups from Auvergne-Rhône-Alpes